Del-Angelo Williams (born 4 August 1993) is a German footballer who plays as a forward for Eintracht Stadtallendorf.

References

External links
 Profile at DFB.de
 

1993 births
Sportspeople from Marburg
Footballers from Hesse
Living people
German footballers
Association football forwards
VfB Marburg players
TSV Eintracht Stadtallendorf players
FC Hansa Rostock players
SV Elversberg players
3. Liga players
Regionalliga players
Oberliga (football) players